The 2009 Okayama GT 300 km was the first round of the 2009 Super GT season. It took place on March 22, 2009.

Race 

Okayama GT 300km
Okayama